Calindoea is a genus of moths belonging to the family Thyrididae.

The species of this genus are found in Southeastern Asia.

Species:

Calindoea acutipennis 
Calindoea atripunctalis
Calindoea cumulalis 
Calindoea dorilusalis

References

Thyrididae
Moth genera